Arbanitis maculosus is a species of armoured trap-door spider in the family Idiopidae,  and is endemic to New South Wales. 

It was first described by William Joseph Rainbow and Robert Henry Pulleine in 1918 as Dyarcyops maculosus, but was transferred to the genus, Misgolas, in 2006 by Wishart and then in 2017 Michael Rix and others transferred it to the genus, Arbanitis.

References

Idiopidae
Spiders described in 1918
Spiders of Australia
Fauna of New South Wales
Taxa named by William Joseph Rainbow